Peace Chant is an outdoor 1984 granite memorial sculpture by Steve Gillman, located at Southwest Park Avenue and Southwest Columbia Street in the South Park Blocks of Portland, Oregon.

Description and history

Funded by the National Park Service and the City of Portland's Housing and Community Development department, it is the first known peace memorial in the state. Gillman intended for the sculpture to "create a space where people could sit and have quiet time" and wanted to "express his own advocacy for peace as well as that of the nearby churches".

The installation is composed of three large pillars. Displayed with the sculpture is a poem chosen by Gillam:

Let us be "Called...by the hopes of children 
to a world of endless wheat and barley sugar...
whatever--the skies now lifted
and the poppies bloomed
and the men and women fed the children 
and the long long lives of elders
kept the history green."

The Smithsonian Institution categorizes Peace Chant as both abstract and allegorical ("peace"). In May 1985, City Council named the block on which the sculpture is installed Peace Plaza.

See also
 1984 in art
 From Within Shalom (1984), another Portland sculpture by Gillman

References

External links
 Peace Chant at the Public Art Archive
 Peace Chant (1984), Portland, Oregon at Waymarking

1984 establishments in Oregon
1984 sculptures
Abstract sculptures in Oregon
Allegorical sculptures in Oregon
Granite sculptures in Oregon
Monuments and memorials in Portland, Oregon
Outdoor sculptures in Portland, Oregon
Peace monuments and memorials
South Park Blocks